Manelli is an Italian surname. Notable people with the surname include:

Francesco Manelli (1594–1667), Italian Baroque composer
Remo Manelli (born 1942), Luxembourgian fencer
Romain Manelli (born 1951), Luxembourgian fencer

See also
Mannelli

Italian-language surnames